Flight 296 may refer to:

Sterling Airways Flight 296, crashed on 14 March 1972
CAAC Flight 296 crashed on May 5, 1983
Air France Flight 296Q, crashed on 26 June 1988

0296